The Duchy of Cornwall Act 1812 (52 Geo 3 c 123) is an Act of the Parliament of the United Kingdom. It is a public general Act. It was omitted from the third revised edition of the statutes because of its local and personal nature.

This Act was partly in force in Great Britain at the end of 2010.

The whole Act, except sections 6 to 9, was repealed by section 1(1) of, and Part IV of Schedule 1 to, the Statute Law (Repeals) Act 1978.

References

Halsbury's Statutes,
The Statutes of the United Kingdom of Great Britain and Ireland, 52 George III. 1812. Printed by His Majesty's Statute and Law Printers. London. 1812. Pages 626 to 634.Digitised copy from Google Books.

United Kingdom Acts of Parliament 1812
Duchy of Cornwall
19th century in Cornwall